The Double ( / The Stand-in) also known as Love Inferno, is a 1971 Italian giallo film directed by Romolo Guerrieri. It stars Ewa Aulin (of Death Laid an Egg fame). The story was based on a novel called La controfigura by Libero Bigiaretti.

Plot
A wealthy young man named Frank (Jean Sorel), who lives off his father, is shot in a parking garage, and as he lays bleeding, he thinks back over recent past events in his life. While vacationing in Morocco with his beautiful 19-year-old girlfriend Lucia (Ewa Aulin), Frank became jealous of her interest in a young American traveler named Eddie (Sergio Doria). Frank later develops a fixation on the girl's pretty mother Nora, (Lucia Bose), and forces her physically into having sex with him. Later he follows Nora back to Rome, where he becomes convinced that now she is having relations with the young American Eddie. Frank later finds Eddie murdered in Nora's apartment, and thinking that she killed him, he tries to protect her by disposing of the corpse. But then he finds out Nora wasn't even in Rome when the murder occurred. The killer is revealed to be a notable professor who had a relationship with Eddie. He then shot Frank at a parking garage, as Frank burned Eddie's corpse. The film ends with Frank's death and the professor's escape.

Cast 
 Jean Sorel as Giovanni 
 Lucia Bosé as  Nora
 Ewa Aulin as  Lucia
 Silvano Tranquilli as  Roger 
 Sergio Doria as  Eddie
 Marilù Tolo as Marie
 Giacomo Rossi Stuart as Giovanni's brother
 Antonio Pierfederici
 Pupo De Luca
 Bruno Boschetti

References

External links

1971 films
1970s crime thriller films
Giallo films
1970s Italian-language films
Films directed by Romolo Guerrieri
Films scored by Armando Trovajoli
1970s Italian films